Dan Ziskie is an American actor and photographer. Ziskie portrayed the character Frank Niggar on a popular sketch on Chappelle's Show. He was on Treme, where he played a politically connected banker in Post-Katrina New Orleans. He had a recurring role as the Vice President of the United States on the first season of House of Cards. He had a guest spot on Person of Interest and The Blacklist, portraying senators on both shows. On the season finale of [[24 (season 5)|24'''s fifth season]] Ziskie played the United States Attorney General who, after hearing an audio recording of the president admitting that he took part in the assassination of a former president, orders his removal from office.

In October 2017 Ziskie released a collection of photographs of the New York City area taken from 2013 to 2016 in his first book, entitled Cloud Chamber''.

Filmography

References

External links
Dan Ziskie on Chappelle's Show

Year of birth missing (living people)
Living people
American male television actors
American male film actors
21st-century American male actors
20th-century American male actors
21st-century American photographers
21st-century American male artists